Evergestis boursini is a moth in the family Crambidae. It was described by Hans Georg Amsel in 1939. It is found in Turkey.

References

Evergestis
Moths described in 1939
Moths of Asia